Aparan is a 1988 Indian Malayalam-language mystery psychological thriller film
written and directed by P. Padmarajan, based on his short story of the same name. It stars Jayaram, Mukesh, Shobana, Parvathy Jayaram and Madhu. The film is about mistaken identity and the problems that a young, innocent man has to undergo in his life. The film was the debut of Jayaram and it was a critical as well as commercial success. The film was remade in Tamil as Manidhan Marivittan (1989). The film is considered as a cult classic in Malayalam cinema.

Plot
K. Vishwanatha Pillai (Jayaram) is an innocent young man in, Alappuzha, who lives with his parents and his younger sister. When he takes a recess before a job interview, he gets mistaken by many for a hardcore criminal and is arrested by the police. Luckily, George Kutty (Mukesh), the police inspector, happens to be the classmate of Vishwanathan and gets him released.  George Kutty explains to Vishwanathan about the crimes done by the doppelganger criminal, whose real name and background is a mystery even for the police. With several criminal cases pending against the doppelganger while still on the run, Vishwanathan is warned to be cautious.

However, things become sour when the mistaken identity costs a marriage proposal for his sister and causes a rift between a lethargic Vishwanathan and his father. 

Eventually, Vishwanathan gets a job in Kochi, the nearest city and falls in love with his co-worker Ambili (Shobhana). Soon enough, she accidentally runs into the criminal who plans to assault her, which makes her hate Vishwanathan. Vishwanathan manages to convince her about the existence of his doppelganger, thus breaks the ice.

Mohandas, his boss in the company has a visitor in his office, who also mistakes Vishwanathan for the criminal and ends up in him losing his job. With a better marriage proposal now lined up for his sister and the subsequent pressure from his mother, Vishwanathan is now desperate for a face to face confrontation with the criminal, while still in the dark about the criminal's whereabouts.

Trying to attract some leads, Vishwanathan poses as the criminal and inadvertently receives a payment originally intended for the criminal, thereby inviting the ire of the latter. Vishwanthan, who takes the money with him for his sister's marriage, is chased by the criminal and his goons. In a bitter fight, the criminal is accidentally stabbed to death by one of his goons. But his body is later mistaken to be that of Vishwanathan's, as the latter's bag containing his certificates and bank passbook was found near the body. 

On reaching home, Vishwanathan witnesses his family performing the last rites for him. That night, Vishwanathan appears in front of his father, hands over the bag of money and explains the facts to him. His father consoles Vishwanathan and tries to bring him back. Vishwanathan refuses to go with him and decides to live as the criminal for the rest of his life, as a revenge for ruining his otherwise peaceful life.

However, towards the very end of the film, the self-proclaimed impostor glances at the pyre, leaving the viewers wondering whether the dead man was the criminal or Vishwanathan.

Cast
 Jayaram as K. Vishwanatha Pillai/ Uthaman
 Shobana as Ambili
 Madhu as Keshava Pillai, Vishwanathan's father
 Mukesh as George Kutty
Jagathy Sreekumar as Santhosh, police head constable 
 Sukumari as Lalitha, Vishwanathan's mother
Jalaja as Sumangala teacher
 Shari as Anna , George Kutty's wife 
 M. G. Soman as Mohandas,M.D, Vishwanathan's boss
 Parvathi as Sindhu, Vishwanathan's sister
 Innocent as Bhaskaran, office attender
 Valsala Menon as Meri Kuriyan Vishwanathan's office staff
 K. P. A. C. Sunny as Kuriyachan, boss's assistant
 Ajith Kollam as the criminal's accomplice
 Indrans as  the postman
Thesni Khan a member of the interview group
 Siddique
 V. K. Sreeraman as Muthalali 
 Surasu as Thrikkottan Govinda Pillai
 James as Man at the Restaurant
 Balakrishna Pillai as Jail Officer
 Omanayamma as The Nun 
 Bhasi as Hotel Maneger
 Saleena as Neena Mathayi
 Krishnan Thrissur as Hotel waiter
 Aloor Elsy (Double Role)

Reception
Aparan is now considered as a cult classic film in Malayalam cinema.

Soundtrack
No songs in this film.

Trivia

Aparan had no songs and had just a handful of characters. The highlight of this film is that the other person, whom Vishwanathan is mistaken to be, is never shown. It is only from the dialogues of other characters that we come to know about him. But in the last few scenes, we happen to hear his voice, while threatening Vishwanathan over the phone.

Parvathy Jayaram, who acted as the sister of Jayaram, later married him in 1992. P. Padmarajan, who launched Jayaram, is also considered as his mentor in cinema. Later, Jayaram acted in two more films by P. Padmarajan.

The basic idea of the film is based on the short story "Aparan" by P. Padmarajan. The credit for the story has been given to Padmarajan and M. K. Chandrasekharan.

References

External links
 

1988 films
1980s Malayalam-language films
1980s mystery thriller films
Indian mystery thriller films
Films with screenplays by Padmarajan
Films based on short fiction
Films scored by Johnson
Films shot in Alappuzha
Malayalam films remade in other languages
Films directed by Padmarajan